The Zee Cine Award for Lifetime Achievement is given to someone who is at the verge of retiring from films and it is to commemorate his/her career at the limelight.

List of Honourees
The respected people are listed below:-

See also 
 Zee Cine Awards
 Bollywood
 Cinema of India

References

Zee Cine Awards
Lifetime achievement awards